The threespot dascyllus (Dascyllus trimaculatus), also known as the domino damsel or simply domino, is a species of damselfish from the family Pomacentridae. It is native to the Indo-Pacific from the Red Sea and East Africa, to the Pitcairn Islands, southern Japan, and Australia, and can also be found in some parts of the Philippines.  Its grey to black body has two lateral white spots and one between the eyes like domino hence the name; the threespot dascyllus grows up to 13 cm in length. Coloration is somewhat variable; the spot on the forehead may be absent and the lateral spots very much reduced. It feeds on algae, copepods and other planktonic crustaceans.

Habitat
Generally, adults are  found in small groups around coral heads or large rocks. Juveniles may be found associated with large sea anemones or sheltering between the spines of diadema sea urchins or branching corals. This species may be found to depths of 55 m.

Etymology
Trimaculatus, meaning "three-spotted", refers to the fish's three white spots. This accounts also for the common name "domino".

In aquarium
During the juvenile period, they live with the sea anemone. They grow fast and can grow up to 14 cm in length in a large fish tank. People who like big fish may raise a pair of small Threespot to observe their growth.

References

External links
 

trimaculatus
Fish of the Red Sea
Fish described in 1829
Taxobox binomials not recognized by IUCN